Dream Coder (Chinese: 梦想程式) is a Singaporean drama produced and telecast on Mediacorp Channel 8 . The show aired at 9pm on weekdays and had a repeat telecast at 8am the following day. It stars Romeo Tan, Joanne Peh, Desmond Tan, Carrie Wong, Aloysius Pang and Yao Wenlong as the main casts of the series.

Cast

Main cast

Ouyang (Fan) Family

Xu (Guangda) Family

Fang (Tianren) Family

He (Xiuxiang) Family

Li (Junheng) Family

Other cast

Production 
Info-communications Media Development Authority (IMDA) supported the production of Dream Coder as a way to promote the technology sector, with an emphasis on the Smart Nation initiative.

Production began in September 2016 and filming wrapped up in December 2016.

In order to ensure that the app development process portrayed in the show is realistic, consultation during script writing process and most of the apps seen in the show were designed and developed by an actual local mobile app development firm Originally US.

The series consists of 20 episodes and started its run from 7 February 2017.

Original Sound Track (OST)

Awards & Nominations
Dream Coder was only nominated for 2 awards in the Star Awards 2018.

Star Awards 2018

International Broadcast

See also
 List of MediaCorp Channel 8 Chinese drama series (2010s)
List of Dream Coder episodes

References

Singapore Chinese dramas
2017 Singaporean television series debuts
2017 Singaporean television series endings
Channel 8 (Singapore) original programming